ABBA 18 Hits was released by Polar Music International on 8 September 2005, and is a compilation of hits by ABBA.

The 18 Hits set was released as a mid-price alternative to the best-selling full-price collection ABBA Gold: Greatest Hits and features 14 of the group's biggest hits and concludes with four non-English versions; "Honey Honey" (Swedish version), "Waterloo" (French version), "Ring Ring" (German version) and the Spanish version of "Gimme! Gimme! Gimme! (A Man After Midnight)", entitled "Dame! Dame! Dame!". Among the more notable omissions on the 18 Hits collection are one of the band's biggest hits, "Dancing Queen", as well as "Chiquitita", "Take a Chance on Me" and "I Have a Dream".

The Swedish edition of 18 Hits, also released in 2005, featured four Swedish language recordings instead of the four non-English versions; "Waterloo", "Honey Honey", "Ring Ring (Bara Du Slog En Signal)" and "Åh Vilka Tider". This is the first ABBA CD to include "Åh Vilka Tider", which had originally been released as the B-side to the Swedish version of "Ring Ring". It would also appear worldwide on The Complete Studio Recordings. A budget-priced DVD entitled 16 Hits was released simultaneously.

While numerous other similar hits compilations with the group have been released both before and since, 18 Hits has proved to be one of Universal Music's bestselling ABBA products, peaking in the Top 10 in Poland and the Top 20 in the UK, Spain and Hungary and re-entering the charts in many territories after the premiere of movie Mamma Mia! in the summer of 2008. It never included any songs from The Visitors or any other songs released from 1981 to 1982.

This compilation is not available digitally, as many tracks, featured in this compilation, are part of other ABBA compilations available in digital distribution. It is, eventually, still repressed on CD for many regions of the world.

Track listing

Personnel

Agnetha Fältskog - lead vocals , co-lead vocals , backing vocals
Anni-Frid Lyngstad - lead vocals , co-lead vocals , backing vocals
Björn Ulvaeus - acoustic guitar, backing vocals
 Benny Andersson – synthesizer, keyboards, backing vocals

Charts

Weekly charts

Year-end charts

Certifications

References

ABBA compilation albums
2005 greatest hits albums
Albums recorded at Polar Studios
Albums produced by Björn Ulvaeus
Albums produced by Benny Andersson